The Physiotherapy Evidence Database, abbreviated PEDro, is a bibliographic database containing randomized trials, clinical practice guidelines and systematic reviews in the field of physical therapy. It was established in October 1999 and is maintained by the Centre for Evidence-Based Physiotherapy at the George Institute for Global Health. As of August 2009, there were more than 15,000 entries indexed on PEDro.

Scale
The website also uses a scale, known as the PEDro scale, to assess the quality of randomized trials included in the database. Trials with higher PEDro scores are displayed first in PEDro search results. A 2010 study found preliminary evidence that this scale, as well as eight of its ten individual items, had validity.

References

External links

Physical therapy
Medical databases
Internet properties established in 1999
Australian health websites
1999 establishments in Australia